The first season of The Sing-Off premiered on December 14, 2009. The show featured eight a cappella groups performing popular songs live. The winner's prize was $100,000 and a Sony Music recording contract. Nick Lachey hosted, while Ben Folds of Ben Folds Five, Shawn Stockman from Boyz II Men and Nicole Scherzinger from The Pussycat Dolls were judges. The show ran for 4 episodes, concluding on December 21, 2009 with a live finale. The group Nota won the title.

Groups

Elimination table

Performances

Episode 1 (December 14, 2009)
Group performance: "Under Pressure"  by Queen/David Bowie

Episode 2 (December 15, 2009)
Theme: Big Hits (first song) and Guilty Pleasures (second song)

Episode 3 (December 16, 2009)
Theme: Superstar Medleys (first round), Judges' Request (second round)
Group performance: "Mr. Blue Sky" by Electric Light Orchestra

Episode 4 (December 21, 2009)
Group performance: "I Still Haven't Found What I'm Looking For" by U2
Guest performance: Medley of Hits by Boyz II Men

Ratings

References

External links

 
 

2009 American television seasons